NASA's Story is a documentary series by Dangerous Films for the BBC to commemorate 50 years since the formation of NASA. The series looks at NASA's early history, the triumphs and disasters, notably the Apollo 1 fire, through to the Apollo Moon missions and the Space Shuttle era. The show includes various interviews with astronauts and NASA personnel such as Chris Kraft, Jon Clark, Leroy Cain, Scott Carpenter, Neil Armstrong and Buzz Aldrin, both crew members of Apollo 11.

The show was broadcast in the United Kingdom and Germany in June and July 2009.

Episodes
The series consists of 4 episodes.

See also 
Apollo Program
Apollo 11 in popular culture

References 

BBC Television shows
2009 British television series debuts
Documentary films about the space program of the United States
Films about NASA